Citizens Republic Bancorp (primary operating name Citizens Bank) was an American bank headquartered in Flint, Michigan that merged with FirstMerit Bank in 2013. Citizens Republic Bancorp operated in the states of Michigan, Ohio, Indiana, and Wisconsin. On September 13, 2012, it completed a merger agreement with FirstMerit Bank of Akron, Ohio. As of April 13, 2013, it became a subsidiary of the FirstMerit Corporation. The merger finalized on June 13, 2013. FirstMerit merged with Huntington Bancshares in 2016.

History

Citizens National Bank
Citizens National Bank was established in 1871 at the height of Flint's great lumber industry. Citizens National Bank played a key role in the development of the auto industry in the United States.  General Motors founder William C. Durant acknowledged that a loan he and partner J. Dallas Dort received from Citizens in 1886 enabled him to start his vehicle manufacturing company now known as General Motors.

Citizens Commercial & Savings Bank
Citizens National Bank switched from a national to a state-chartered institution in 1890 as Citizens Commercial & Savings Bank. In 1928, the original bank building was demolished and the a new headquarters building, Citizens Bank Building, was built on the site. In 1937, the Bank began its annual Citizens' Holiday Sing.

The Weather Ball on the bank headquarters was first illuminated August 30, 1956.  The ball is a regular beacon in the city except from 1974 until January 1, 1978, when it was turned off during the 1970s energy crisis.

Citizens Banking Corporation
Citizens Commercial & Savings Bank formed a holding company, Citizens Banking Corporation, in 1981 to acquire additional banks. Banks acquired were Grayling State Bank and State Bank of Standish in 1984. Citizens Banking acquired Second National Bank of Saginaw and Second National Bank of Bay City in 1985. On November 6, 1986, Citizens Banking indicated that will purchase National Bank of Illinois as its first non-Michigan acquisition followed in 1987 with the purchase of Commercial National Bank of Berwyn, Illinois.  David T. Dort, son of J. Dallas Dort, retired April 10, 1988, as the longest-serving director of Citizen Banking Corp. after 22 years.

On April 8, 1991, Citizens Banking designated $15 million in loans for small businesses in county's poor and minority communities over three years.  The bank purchased Bishop International Airport expansion bonds January 15, 1992, saving the airport $2 million on a $34 million project.  On February 18, 1992, Citizens pledged $15,000 toward construction of the Robert M. Perry School of Banking building at Central Michigan University.  In a 1993 partnership with Kmart, the Bank gave "real" working experience to students of Stewart Elementary School in Flint. The same year, Citizens also sponsored a "Safe Streets" gun buy-back program. Citizens acquired a number of other financial institutions in the mid-1990s including Royal Bank Group Inc., October 1, 1993; four Michigan locations of Banc One, February 28, 1995; and CB Financial, July 1, 1997.  National City Corporation sold one Michigan branch to the Corporation on October 15, 1998.  In the last quarter of 1999, Citizens purchased 17 branches from Bank One. In 1999, Citizens also acquired F&M Bancorporation, Kaukauna, with banks in Wisconsin and Iowa which continued to operate F&M Bank as a separate bank.

TCF Financial Corporation sold three locations to Citizens Banking on May 12, 2000. On April 25, 2005, F&M Bank-Wisconsin changed its name to Citizens Bank as Citizens Banking Corporation had applied to consolidate the two banks.

Citizens Republic Bancorp
The Bancorp acquired on December 29, 2006 Republic Bancorp Inc. of (Ann Arbor, Michigan) to become, at the time, the 45th largest U.S. bank-holding company. After this acquisition it was renamed to Citizens Republic Bancorp.  In order for the Federal Reserve Bank to approve the merger with Republic Bank, Republic sold seven local branches to First Place Financial under its Franklin Bank subsidiary.  In 2008, the Bancorp took a $300 U.S. Troubled Asset Relief loan to survive the economic downturn.  In 2010, Citizens Republic sold its F&M Bank Iowa locations for $50 million cash to Great Western Bank.  In 2011, the Bank agreed to a settlement in a Redlining case brought against them as Republic Bank's successor by the US Department of Justice triggered by a Board of Governors of the Federal Reserve System complaint which will require them to open a loan office in a Detroit black neighborhood and $3.6 million for loans and grants in Wayne County.

In 2010, the corporation took a loss of $286 million, its largest annual loss in three years of consecutive losses while turning that around to a net income of $17 million for 2011. In 2011, the US Department of Treasury appointed two directors to the bank's board as it had failed to make payments on the bailout funds.  For the first time since the economic downturn, the Bank reports in July 2012 five consecutive quarters of profit.

FirstMerit merger
In August 2012, Citizens Republic had not repaid its $300 million bailout loan from the US Treasury. The bank holding company consider issuing stock to pay the debt back, but instead put itself up for sale with J.P. Morgan Chase hired to find a buyer. Huntington Bank was considered a potential buyer as Huntington was expanding in Michigan. On September 13, 2012, Akron, Ohio-based FirstMerit Corporation announced it would acquire Citizens in a stock-for-stock merger transaction valued at approximately $912 million. The merger was expected to close in the second quarter of 2013.  With the stock payment worth less than the stock's tangible book value, several law firms started looking into a possible case of breached fiduciary duties by Citizens Republic's Board of Directors.

Sandy Pierce was appointed in January 2013 as FirstMerit's vice chair and chairman and CEO of FirstMerit Michigan.  In early April, both Bank Corporations' shareholders approved the merger.  On April 12, 2013, First Merit Corporation closed on its acquisition of the company. On April 13, it became known as, "Citizens Bank: Now part of FirstMerit Bank."

Citizens Banking Building
The Citizens Banking Building is currently the Flint headquarters for Huntington Bank. The building is more a complex of three buildings, the North, South, and West building, which are interconnected. The ground and second floors connect the North and South buildings, while the South and West buildings are connected via the second and third floors over Buckham Alley.

In 1928, the South building was built with a lower level vault with a door weighing 43 tons which was then the largest vault door in the state. In the 1950s, a 4 four-story annex was added on its south side. West was built next in 1958 with four stories with 2 more added in 1965. The North Building was the final building build in 1974 as a 10-story building.

On June 13, 2013, the building was given a new FirstMerit Bank sign along with revealing the new design of the Weatherball. In October 2015, the University of Michigan–Flint announced a purchase agreement for $6 million the North tower of the building to be completed by March 31. The week of April 25 2018, the "FM" letters were removed for the current owners of the bank building, Huntington Bank, which purchase First Merit.

Weatherball

The symbol of the bank is the weatherball located atop its headquarters in downtown Flint and was built in 1956. Currently it is lettered for Huntington Bank.

The Weather Ball on the bank headquarters was first illuminated August 30, 1956. A poem explaining the weather meaning behind the ball's colors. In 1964, a Citizens Bank jingle was crafted by Jackie Bowles from the poem, with small alternation to the words, and set to Cumberland Mountain Bear Chase music. The ball is a regular beacon in the city except from 1974 until January 1, 1978, when it was turned off during the 1970s energy crisis. The weatherball was officially re-lettered for FirstMerit Bank in November 2013. The original "CB" letters were removed and were supposedly going to be put in the Sloan Museum in Flint, Michigan. Unfortunately, because of their poor condition due to their age, they had to be recycled. The "CB" initials underneath were made of neon piping for the letters with a metal, reflective backing behind the neon letters, and the letters were mounted on square porcelain plates.

The Weather Ball was operated by Citizens Republic Bancorp based on National Weather Service forecasts, and is still operated the same way. The Weather Ball’s construction materials include 800 square feet of Plexiglas and 667 feet of lighting tubing. The Weather Ball can be seen for 25 miles and is designed to withstand winds of up to 120 mph.

Weight: 2.5 tons 
Height: 15 feet 
Diameter: 15 feet 
Circumference: 47 feet.

References 

Banks based in Michigan
Huntington Bancshares
2013 mergers and acquisitions
Defunct banks of the United States